The Oregon Coast Scenic Railroad (OCSR) is a  heritage railroad, a 501(c)(3) non-profit organization, operating in Oregon, primarily between Garibaldi and Rockaway Beach, with additional special trips to Wheeler, Nehalem River and into the Salmonberry River canyon. The railroad travels on tracks that pass along the edge of Tillamook Bay and the Oregon Coast, and through thick forest along the Nehalem River.

Railroad operations
The railroad currently operates two steam locomotives in regular service.   One of these is the Polson Logging No. 2, a 2-8-2 type made by the Baldwin Locomotive Works, and the other is the former McCloud Railway No. 25, a 2-6-2 type made by the American Locomotive Company.  The 25 was used in the movie Stand by Me.  Both engines were originally used in the early 20th century for logging.

Operating Diesel locomotives include the Great Northern Railway No. 274 EMD F7, former POTB EMD SD9 No. 6139, and former POTB EMD GP9, No. 101.

Projects
As of 2015, several steam locomotive restoration/reconstruction projects are planned or underway.  Among them is the complete restoration of the Deep River No. 7 "Skookum", a 2-4-4-2 Mallet locomotive. This restoration was completed in 2019. Another restoration project is for the former Sunset Timber No. 1, a 3-truck Heisler locomotive that was moved to Tillamook in 2015.

Salmonberry River
During 2014 the OCSR has been in a series of legal challenges with the State of Oregon over their attempts to reconstruct track in the Salmonberry River corridor that had been damaged in winter storms of 2007. The central issue was the OCSR's work included placing rock fill on the bank of the river, for which they had not obtained state permits, potentially impacting native salmon and steelhead.  OCSR's position was that as a railroad, federal law exempted them from state environmental regulations.  In March 2015, a decision was reported that exempted the OCSR from the state regulations.

Railroad

Locomotives

All of the railroad's locomotives are serviced at the locomotive shops in Garibaldi, Oregon.

See also

 List of heritage railroads in the United States

References

External links

 Oregon Coast Scenic Railroad
 Curtiss Lumber Co. 2
 McCloud River Railroad Company / McCloud Railway Company Locomotive #25
 Little River Railroad #126/Columbia River Belt Line "Skookum"
 Port of Tillamook Bay 6139

Tourist attractions in Tillamook County, Oregon
Railway companies established in 2003
Heritage railroads in Oregon